Richard Victor Lewis (born 6 August 1947) is a former English cricketer. Lewis was a right-handed batsman.

Biography 
Born on 6 August 1947 in Winchester, Hampshire, Lewis signed for Hampshire in 1967, making his first-class debut against Oxford University that year. In 1968 he became a regular player in the Hampshire team after making his County Championship debut against Somerset. He played in twelve first-class matches in 1968, scoring 349 runs at an average of average of 17.45, including a single century, 114 against Oxford University. In the 1969 season he made his List A debut against Yorkshire.

Lewis spent nine years with Hampshire, during which he played 103 first-class matches and was a member of Hampshire's 1973 County Championship winning squad. He scored 3282 runs for Hampshire at an average of 18.97, with a highest score of 136. He made two centuries and thirteen fifties, and took 65 catches. In List A cricket Lewis played 82 matches, scoring 1,173 runs at an average of 18.04, including five fifties and a highest score of 79. At the end of the 1976 County Championship he left Hampshire.

In 1977 Lewis began playing Minor Counties cricket for Dorset. He played 82 Minor Counties Championship matches between 1977 and 1989. He represented Minor Counties West three times in the Benson and Hedges Cup. In the 1979 season he played a first-class match for a Minor Counties team against the touring Indians. Also in 1979 he made three List-A appearances for the Minor Counties South in the Benson and Hedges Cup. From 1980 to 1983 Lewis represented the Minor Counties in Benson and Hedges Cup matches. In 1981 he represented the team in his final first-class match against the touring Sri Lankans.

Lewis toured Bangladesh with the MCC in 1980–81.

In 1983 Lewis made his Dorset List A debut in the 1983 NatWest Trophy against Essex. His final List A match came in the same competition in 1986 against Somerset. At the end of the 1986 Minor Counties Championship season he retired from representative cricket.

References

External links
Richard Lewis on Cricinfo
Richard Lewis on CricketArchive

1947 births
Living people
Cricketers from Winchester
English cricketers
Hampshire cricketers
Dorset cricketers
Minor Counties cricketers